Granblue Fantasy Versus: Rising is a 2.5D fighting game sequel of Granblue Fantasy Versus developed by Arc System Works and published by Cygames for the PlayStation 5, PlayStation 4 and Microsoft Windows via Steam.

Gameplay
The systems in Granblue Fantasy Versus: Rising is updated from the first game, in additions to rollback netcode and crossplay. Among the introduces mechanics for this sequel game also includes, Dash Attacks, which works similarly to the ones which were seen Under Night In-Birth, as well as auto-combo-based Triple Attack has been updated.

Rising also features lobby-based mini games, such as "Rising Royale" and "Gold Brick Hoarder".

Characters 

All characters from the first game returns, in additions to new characters. Some of these new characters in this game originally winners of 2022 additional character polls who were meant to be DLCs in the first game.

 New Characters
 Anila

Development and release 
The sub-series game's director Tetsuya Fukuhara expressed a desire for a sequel to be produced. Speculation was uncertain on whether the first Versus will get a PlayStation 5 upgrade with minor updates, but ultimately decide to direct the sequel, by the time he announced the latter after GBVS Cygames Cup Special on January 23, 2023, expected to be released around later months of 2023. The characters on poll results from GBVS Cygames Cup 2022 Special originally meant to be potential DLC characters, but later being shifted as new characters for this sequel game.

See also 
 List of fighting games

References

External links

Cygames official website

2023 video games
Arc System Works games
Crossover fighting games
Esports games
Fantasy video games
Fiction about monsters
Fighting role-playing video games
Fighting games used at the Evolution Championship Series tournament
Granblue Fantasy
Guilty Gear
Multiplayer video games
PlayStation 4 games
PlayStation 5 games
Single-player video games
Video games about magic
Video games based on Arthurian legend
Video games developed in Japan
Video games featuring female protagonists
Video games featuring protagonists of selectable gender
Video games scored by Yasunori Nishiki
Video games set on fictional islands
Video games with 2.5D graphics
Video games with cel-shaded animation
Video games with downloadable content
Windows games
Unreal Engine games